PodCastle is a weekly audio fantasy fiction podcast. They release audio performances of fantasy short fiction, including all the subgenres of fantasy, including magical realism, urban fantasy, slipstream, high fantasy, and dark fantasy. As of 2022, Shingai Njeri Kagunda and Eleanor R. Wood share editing duties with support from Assistant Editor Sofía Barker and audio producers Devin Martin and Eric Valdes, and the show is mainly hosted by Matt Dovey, with occasional guest hosts.

History
PodCastle was the third show conceived by Escape Artists, Inc. founder, Serah Eley, which also produces Escape Pod, Pseudopod and Cast of Wonders. PodCastle launched on 1 April 2008 with Rachel Swirsky as founding editor and Ann Leckie as assistant editor. Swirsky left in 2010 to focus on her own writing, and went on to win the 2013 Nebula Award for Best Short Story for her "If You Were A Dinosaur, My Love". While editor at PodCastle, Leckie's 2013 novel, Ancillary Justice, won multiple awards, including the 2014 Hugo Award for best novel.

Editors Anna Schwind and Dave Thompson stepped down at the end of March 2015 and were slated to be replaced by Kitty NicIaian and Dawn Phynix, with Leckie continuing to serve as associate editor. However, the new editors were unable to take the helm, and Rachael K. Jones and Graeme Dunlop began sharing editing and hosting duties instead.

In 2017 the editorial reins were handed over to an international cohort headed by co-editors Khaalidah Muhammad Ali and Jen R. Albert, with Setsu Uzumé (later known as Summer Fletcher) hosting. Khaalidah stepped down to concentrate on her own writing in early 2019 and was replaced by C. L. Clark ("Cherae"); in mid-2021, Albert and Cherae both departed to concentrate on their respective careers and were replaced by Shingai Njeri Kagunda and Eleanor R. Wood. Summer Fletcher stepped down from the assistant editor and host roles at the end of 2021 and was replaced by Sofia Barker and Matt Dovey respectively.

Content
PodCastle has released hundreds of stories on a weekly basis with stories generally between 2,000 and 6,000 words long, written by authors such as Peter S. Beagle, Nancy Kress, Jeff VanderMeer, N.K. Jemisin, Kelly Link and Ken Liu. Although focused on short fiction, PodCastle has also run reviews and longer stories, both as hour-plus "Giant" episodes and as multi-part serials.

PodCastle is distributed under a Creative Commons license that allows non-commercial redistribution, requires attribution, and forbids derivatives.  The fiction itself remains copyrighted by its respective authors.  PodCastle contracts with authors for non-exclusive audio rights and pays semi-professional rates. In 2013 the site averaged 79,900 monthly downloads of the podcast. Podcasts such as Podcastle, Pseudopod, and EscapePod provide a means of accessing speculative fiction online.

Reception
Eugie Foster, for The UK SF Book News Network, wrote that "short fiction audio podcast magazines like Escape Pod and its sister publications, Pseudopod and PodCastle, have caught the interest and imagination of fiction enthusiasts, and doing a wonderful job at reviving awareness in both new short fiction and classic works".

Accolades

See also
 Fantasy podcast

Notes

References

External links
 

Audio podcasts
Fantasy fiction magazines
Magazines established in 2008
2008 podcast debuts
Weekly magazines published in the United States
Fantasy podcasts
American podcasts
Monologue podcasts